Lee Pil-mo (born June 26, 1974) is a South Korean actor.

Personal life
In December 2018 K-star Entertainment announced that Lee, who was in an onscreen relationship with the interior designer Seo Soo-yeon on TV Chosun's dating show Taste of Love, would be getting married in Spring 2019.

On February 9, 2019, Lee married Seo Soo-yeon in a private ceremony. All four on-screen brothers from the 2009 KBS drama My Too Perfect Sons were present at the wedding. Actor Son Hyun-joo was the main host of the wedding while Ji Chang-wook and Han Sang-jin were present as well. Lee and his wife welcomed their first child, a son, on August 14, 2019. In February 2022, his wife posted on SNS that his wife was pregnant with their second child, due for delivery in August 2022.

Filmography

Television series

Web series

Film

Variety show

Theater

Awards and nominations

References

External links

 

South Korean male television actors
South Korean male film actors
South Korean male musical theatre actors
South Korean male stage actors
21st-century South Korean male actors
People from Seoul
Living people
1974 births
Goseong Lee clan